The Mayor of Waimate officiates over the Waimate District of New Zealand's South Island. The district is administered by a district council.

Craig Rowley has been the mayor of Waimate since 2013.

List of mayors
There have been 21 mayors of Waimate.

References

Waimate
Waimate
Waimate District